The 1999 United States Open Championship was the 99th U.S. Open, held June 17–20 at Pinehurst Resort Course No. 2 in Pinehurst, North Carolina. Payne Stewart won his second U.S. Open and third major championship, one stroke ahead of runner-up Phil Mickelson.

After a birdie at the penultimate hole to regain an outright lead, Stewart sank a  par putt on the final hole for 279 (−1) and avoided a Monday playoff. He redeemed himself at the U.S. Open, after losing a four-stroke 54-hole lead the year before in San Francisco. Stewart did not get a chance to defend his title in 2000, as he died four months later in a plane crash. The U.S. Open was his eleventh and final PGA Tour win.

Major winners Tiger Woods and Vijay Singh were in contention late in their final rounds, but each bogeyed and finished two strokes back, tied for third.

This was the first U.S. Open at Pinehurst, which returned in 2005 and 2014. Previously, it hosted the PGA Championship in 1936, the Ryder Cup in 1951, and the North and South Open from 1902 through 1951. More recently, it was the site of season-ending Tour Championship in 1991 and 1992.

Course layout
Course No. 2

Source:

Past champions in the field

Made the cut

Missed the cut

Round summaries

First round
Thursday, June 17, 1999

Second round
Friday, June 18, 1999

The 36-hole cut was at 147 (+7) or better, and 68 players advanced to the weekend.

Amateurs: Kuehne (+7), Molder (+11), Barnes (+13), Kuchar (+15), McKnight (+15), Call (+20).

Third round
Saturday, June 19, 1999

Final round
Sunday, June 20, 1999

Source:

Amateurs: Hank Kuehne (+26)

Scorecard
Final round

Cumulative tournament scores, relative to par

Source:

References

External links
USOpen.com – History

U.S. Open (golf)
Golf in North Carolina
U.S. Open
U.S. Open (golf)
U.S. Open (golf)
U.S. Open (golf)